The 54th NAACP Image Awards, presented by the NAACP, honored outstanding representations and achievements of people of color in motion pictures, television, music, and literature during the 2022 calendar year. The ceremony was hosted by Queen Latifah and aired on February 25, 2023, on BET and simulcast on several of its sister Paramount Global Networks along with Paramount+. Presentations of untelevised categories was livestreamed from February 20 to February 24, 2023, on the ceremony's website.

The nominations were announced on January 12, 2023, with the film Black Panther: Wakanda Forever leading the nominations with twelve nods, followed by the television sitcom Abbott Elementary which led the television categories with nine nominations. In the recording categories, Beyoncé and Kendrick Lamar lead the nominations with five each. For the first time in the history of the awards ceremony, three categories were added to reward Outstanding Hairstyling, Outstanding Make-Up and Outstanding Costume Design in film and television.

All nominees are listed below, and the winners are listed in bold.

Special Awards

Motion Picture

Television

Drama

Comedy

Television Movie, Limited-Series or Dramatic Special

Reality and Variety

Other Categories

Overall Acting

Documentary

Costume Design, Make-up and Hairstyling

Recording

Podcast and Social Media

Literary

References

External links 

 NAACP Image Awards official site

NAACP Image Awards
NAACP
NAACP
NAACP
NAACP
NAACP